Agra Division is one of the divisions of Uttar Pradesh, India. It contains Agra, Firozabad, Mainpuri and Mathura districts. The Population of Agra Division was 11,304,646 as of 2011. The headquarter of the division is in Agra City.

Districts 
 Agra
 Mathura
 Firozabad 
 Mainpuri

References

 
Divisions of Uttar Pradesh